Bernard Rawlings may refer to:

Sir Bernard Rawlings (Royal Navy officer) (1889–1962), British admiral of World War II
Barney Rawlings (Bernard Wayne Rawlings, 1920–2004), American bomber pilot in World War II